Matteo Tosetti (born 15 February 1992) is a Swiss professional footballer who plays for AC Bellinzona.

Club career
Tosetti began his playing career with hometown club Losone Sportiva until a move to FC Locarno in 2005. There he rose through the youth ranks and eventually made his first team debut on 24 May 2009 against FC Gossau, coming on as a substitute in a 4–0 away win. He would go on to make one further appearance for the club until his transfer to BSC Young Boys in August 2010. Tosetti in the coming seasons featured prominently for the reserve team until making a breakthrough into the first team during the second half of the 2010–11 Swiss Super League. He made his debut for Young Boys on 13 March 2011 against FC St. Gallen and would make a further five appearances that term. During the second part of the 2011–12 season Tosetti would go on loan to second-tier side FC Wohlen, making his debut against SC Kriens on 21 March 2012 in a 3–0 victory. He continued his loan into the 2012–13 season and scored his first goal for Wohlen on 22 July 2012 in a 1–0 away win over FC Wil.

In July 2013, he joined FC Lugano on loan from BSC Young Boys. On 19 February 2014, he was then sold to Lugano.

International career
Tosetti is of Italian descent. Tosetti is a Switzerland youth international, having previously competed at under-17 and under-19 level and currently under-20 level. In 2009, he was part of the Swiss under-17 team that won the 2009 FIFA U-17 World Cup beating the host nation Nigeria 1-0 in the final. Tosetti featured as a substitute in one match at the tournament, a win in the semi-final versus Colombia.

Honours
FIFA U-17 World Cup: 2009

References

External links
 
 

1992 births
Living people
Swiss men's footballers
Swiss people of Italian descent
Association football midfielders
Association football forwards
FC Locarno players
BSC Young Boys players
FC Wohlen players
FC Lugano players
FC Thun players
FC Sion players
Swiss Super League players
Swiss Challenge League players
Switzerland youth international footballers